Swedish Armed Forces Medal of Merit (FMGMmsv/FMSMmsv/FMGM/FMSM) is a Swedish reward medal established in 1995 by the Swedish Armed Forces.

History
The Swedish Armed Forces Medal of Merit in silver or gold has been awarded to personnel who performed extraordinary effort that benefited the Swedish Armed Forces, for example, with resourcefulness and energetically action and with an example of excellent leadership and personal commitment. The medal, which was awarded to the year 2007, usually did not come into question in connection with foreign service as far as the extraordinary efforts etc, did not have a strict national dimension.

In 2007, this medal was merged with the Swedish Armed Forces International Service Medal of Reward and instead the Swedish Armed Forces Medal of Merit was established in 2008.

Appearance
The medal is of the 8th size and the ribbon is of yellow moiré. A sword in gold/silver may be attached to the ribbon.

References

Orders, decorations, and medals of Sweden
Awards established in 1995
Awards disestablished in 2007
1995 establishments in Sweden
2007 disestablishments in Sweden